Coes Creek is a rural locality in the Sunshine Coast Region, Queensland, Australia.

Geography

The eastern boundary of Coes Creek is marked by Petrie Creek, a tributary of the Maroochy River.

History 
The locality takes its name from the creek, which in turn was name after selector Robert Coe, who was killed by a train. The Queensland Place Names Board approved the naming of the creek and the district after Coe on 1 December 1962.

References

External links
 University of Queensland: Queensland Places: Coes Creek

Suburbs of the Sunshine Coast Region
Localities in Queensland